West Point Island (originally known as Albatross Island) is one of the Falkland Islands, lying in the north-west corner of the archipelago. The island is owned by Roddy & Lily Napier and run as a sheep farm and tourist attraction.

Description

West Point Island lies off the north-west point of West Falkland. West Point Island Settlement, with its  airstrip, lies on Westpoint Cove in the north-east. It is separated from West Falkland by a narrow channel called the Wooly Gut, which is a local reference to katabatic winds that often occur there. It lies south-east of the Jason Islands, the nearest being South Jason Island.

History
As with many locations around the Falkland Islands, in the early 19th century West Point was a popular site for slaughtering seals and penguins for oil. Literal overkill ended this industry in the area.  The island was established as a sheep farm in 1879 by Arthur Felton, great uncle of Roddy Napier, the present owner.

Tourism
In February 1968, the late Lars-Eric Lindblad brought the Chilean government vessel Navarino to the Falklands with the first cruise tourists. This is widely recognized as the birth of Falklands tourism. The Navarino visited West Point Island and Mr. Lindblad started a long, close friendship with the Napier family. He also fell in love with their island and over the following 25 years helped turn it into one of the most popular cruise ship destinations outside the capital Port Stanley. Today West Point receives many expedition vessels every summer, their passengers taking Zodiacs and tenders ashore to explore this magnificent island. Large colonies of Black-browed albatrosses and Southern Rockhopper penguins, and the highest sea cliffs in the Falklands are the main attraction. Legendary West Point hospitality also awaits.

Flora and fauna
The Falklands endemic Felton's flower, which was named after the current owner's great uncle who discovered it, occurs in relative abundance.  The island gardens have a fairly wide selection of introduced plants including roses, foxgloves, daisies, red hot pokers etc. Unusually for the Falklands, there are also a few trees.

The West Point Island group, which includes nearby Gibraltar Rock, Low Island and Dunbar Island, has been identified by BirdLife International as an Important Bird Area (IBA).  Birds for which the site is of conservation significance include Falkland steamer ducks, ruddy-headed geese, southern rockhopper penguins, Magellanic penguins, black-browed albatrosses, striated caracaras, blackish cinclodes, Cobb's wrens and white-bridled finches.  The waters around the islands are home to Commerson's dolphins.

References

External links
 
 Falklands photos, including West Point section

Islands of the Falkland Islands
Important Bird Areas of the Falkland Islands
Seabird colonies
Penguin colonies